Aurélie Claudel (born 7 August 1980) is a French model and actress.

Biography 
Claudel has been featured on the covers and as well as inside pages of a variety of high-fashion magazines including Vogue (American, Italian, French, German, Spanish, Japanese, Australian), Marie Claire (American, Italian, French, German), Glamour (American, Italian, French), Elle (American, British, French, Spanish, Italian), Harper's Bazaar, Allure, Numéro, Flair, Arena, W Magazine, D Magazine, the Pirelli calendar and the Sports Illustrated Swimsuit Issue.

Claudel has worked with fashion photographers like Steven Meisel, Herb Ritts, Irving Penn, Mario Testino, Patrick Demarchelier, Peter Lindbergh, Craig McDean, Paolo Roversi, Reagan Cameron, Gilles Bensimon, Nathaniel Goldberg, Steven Klein, Wayne Maser and David Bailey.

In addition to her print work, Claudel has appeared in numerous ad campaigns including Ralph Lauren, Valentino, Chanel, Chloé, Armani, Nautica, DKNY, Trussardi Jeans, Nina Ricci, Bill Blass, Oscar De La Renta. Cesare Paciotti, Cole Haan, Sephora, Emanuel Ungaro and Victoria's Secret. She was also the face of Calvin Klein's fragrance, Truth and held a cosmetics contract with Revlon, Ultima, Guerlain and Clarins.

She has also been a runway model for many designers including Victoria's Secret, Tommy Hilfiger, Ralph Lauren, Marc Jacobs, Jill Stuart, Diane Von Furstenberg, Jil Sander, Fendi, Christian Dior, Dolce & Gabbana, Richard Tyler, Christian Lacroix, Vivienne Westwood, DKNY, Nicole Miller, Caroline Herrera, Ellen Tracy, BCBG, Vera Wang, Halston, Bill Blass, Vivienne Tam, Jill Stuart, Cynthia Rowley & Hugo Boss.

Claudel made a special guest appearance in the Ricky Martin video "Private Emotion" directed by Francis Lawrence.

Filmography 

Fading Gigolo directed by John Turturro
Alter Egos directed by Jordan Galland
 Ricky Martin's "Private Emotion" video

References

External links 
 Sports Illustrated Swimsuit Collection: Aurélie Claudel
 
 
 Aurélie Claudel Bio at AskMen

French film actresses
French female models
Living people
1980 births
People from Laxou